Logan Campbell (born 12 October 1987) is a Canadian Paralympic sailor. He won a bronze medal at the 2016 Summer Paralympics in the Three-Person Keelboat (Sonar).

References

External links
 
 
 Logan Campbell at Cœur Handisport 

1987 births
Canadian male sailors (sport)
Living people
Paralympic bronze medalists for Canada
Sailors at the 2012 Summer Paralympics
Sailors at the 2016 Summer Paralympics
Sportspeople from Saskatoon
Medalists at the 2016 Summer Paralympics
Paralympic medalists in sailing
Paralympic sailors of Canada